A statue of Pierre Belain d'Esnambuc was installed in Fort-de-France, Martinique, until 2020.

References

Monuments and memorials removed during the George Floyd protests
Outdoor sculptures in France
Sculptures of men
Statues in France
Vandalized works of art
Statues removed in 2020